Ek Hi Bhool is a Pakistani television soap opera which aired on ARY Digital.
Apart from some actors the serial has introduces fresh cast. First episode was aired on 17 April 2017.

Cast
Maham Amir as Masooma
Jahanzeb Khan as Noman
Javeria Ajmal as Momina
Majida Hamid as Fatima
Syed Hamza as Nofil
Adnan Jilani as Wasif
Kiran Qureshi as Sara
Zeb Chaudhry as Naila 
Jahanara Hai as Safia
Anwar Iqbal as Waqar (Episode 1-6)
Qazi Wajid as Shah Sahab (Episode 1-10)
Adnan Saeed

References

Pakistani television soap operas
Pakistani drama television series
2017 Pakistani television series debuts
2017 Pakistani television series endings
Urdu-language television shows
ARY Digital original programming
ARY Digital